South High School may refer to the following high schools in the United States:

 South High School (Bakersfield, California) 
 South High School (Torrance, California)
 South High School (Denver, Colorado)
 South High School (Pueblo, Colorado)
 South High School (Akron, Ohio), closed 1980
 South High School (Cleveland, Ohio), closed 2010
 South High School (Columbus, Ohio)
 South High School (Springfield, Ohio), closed 2008
 South High School (Willoughby, Ohio)
 South High School (Youngstown, Ohio), closed in 1993
 South High School (Minnesota) in Minneapolis
 South High School (Michigan), in Grand Rapids, closed 1968
 South High School (Utah) in Salt Lake City, closed 1988

Schools with variant names
 Central Bucks South High School in Warrington, Pennsylvania
 Cheyenne South High School in Cheyenne, Wyoming
 Crystal Lake South High School in Crystal Lake, Illinois
 Downers Grove South High School, in Downers Grove, Illinois
 Fargo South High School in Fargo, North Dakota
 Maine South High School in Park Ridge, Illinois
 Newton South High School in Newton, Massachusetts
 Omaha South High School in Omaha, Nebraska
 Parkersburg South High School in Parkersburg, West Virginia
 Plainfield South High School in Plainfield, Illinois
 Sheboygan South High School in Sheboygan, Wisconsin
 South Anchorage High School in Anchorage, Alaska
 South Division High School in Chicago, Illinois, later renamed Wendell Phillips Academy High School
 South Division High School in Milwaukee, Wisconsin
 South High Community School in Worcester, Massachusetts
 Valley Stream South High School in Valley Stream, New York
 Waukesha South High School, in Waukesha, Wisconsin
 Williamsville South High School in Williamsville, New York

See also
 Southern High School (disambiguation)
 Southside High School (disambiguation)